Armstrong is a surname of Scottish borders origin. It derives from a Middle English nickname which meant someone with strong arms. In Ireland the name was adopted as an Anglicization of two Gaelic names from Ulster: Mac Thréinfhir (meaning "son of the strong man") and Ó Labhraidh Tréan (meaning "strong O'Lavery"). Clan Armstrong is a clan from the border area between England and Scotland. The Scottish Armstrong is reputed to have been originally bestowed by "an antient (sic) king of Scotland" upon "Fairbairn, his armour-bearer" following an act of strength in battle. In the UK this surname is well represented in North East England, Cumbria, Lancashire, Yorkshire, Scottish Borders, Lanarkshire, Ayrshire, Dumfries & Galloway, and Northern Ireland, and in the US it is well represented in the Deep South, and other southern states.

From the name Ó Labhraidh Tréan (meaning "strong O'Lavery" and sometimes written in Anglo-Irish as "Tréanlámagh") the following surnames survive: "Trainor", Traynor", O'Lavery", "McLavery", and "MacLavery". Although the name "Armstrong" is quite common in the Aghagallon and Glenavy area of County Antrim in Northern Ireland, the other names are to be found within the nine Ulster Counties and Scotland, especially along the west coast.

Real people

Disambiguation of common names with this surname
Brad Armstrong (disambiguation) several people
Charles Armstrong (disambiguation) several people
Chris Armstrong (disambiguation) several people
Craig Armstrong (disambiguation) several people
David Armstrong (disambiguation) several people
Edward Armstrong (disambiguation) several people
Gary Armstrong (disambiguation) several people
George Armstrong (disambiguation) several people
Harry Armstrong (disambiguation) or Henry Armstrong, several people
Ian Armstrong (disambiguation) several people
James Armstrong (disambiguation) several people
Joe Armstrong (disambiguation) several people
John Armstrong (disambiguation) several people
Joseph Armstrong (disambiguation) several people
Margaret Armstrong (disambiguation) several people
Martin Armstrong (disambiguation) several people
Mary Armstrong (disambiguation) several people
Michael Armstrong (disambiguation) or Mike Armstrong, several people
Neil Armstrong (disambiguation) several people
Paul Armstrong (disambiguation) several people
Richard Armstrong (disambiguation) several people
Robert Armstrong (disambiguation) several people
Samuel Armstrong (disambiguation) several people
Thomas Armstrong (disambiguation), several people
Tim Armstrong (disambiguation) several people
William Armstrong (disambiguation) several people:

Arts and letters
Alun Armstrong (actor), English actor
 Angeline Armstrong, Australian singer, songwriter, guitarist, and the frontwoman of Telenova
Anton Armstrong, American choral conductor and professor
Benita Armstrong, British sculptor
Beth Diane Armstrong, South African sculptor
Billie Joe Armstrong, American vocalist of Green Day
Campbell Armstrong, Scottish writer
Curtis Armstrong, American actor 
Eve Armstrong, New Zealand artist
Florian Cloud de Bounevialle Armstrong, British pop singer Dido
Frankie Armstrong, English vocalist
Franny Armstrong, film director
Gail Armstrong (illustrator), British artist
Gillian Armstrong, Australian film director
Heather Armstrong, aka Dooce, American writer
Helen Maitland Armstrong, American stained glass artist
Jeannette Armstrong, Canadian writer
Jerome Armstrong, American journalist
Karen Armstrong, English author
Kelley Armstrong, Canadian author
Kerry Armstrong, Australian actor
Louis Armstrong (1901–1971), American jazz musician
Maitland Armstrong (1836–1918), American artist and diplomat
Margaret Neilson Armstrong, book designer, illustrator, and writer
Mick Armstrong, Australian socialist and author
Paige Armstrong, American Christian singer-songwriter
Peter Armstrong, English poet
R. G. Armstrong, American actor
Randy Armstrong (disambiguation), several people
Ruth Alice Armstrong (1850–?), American social activist, writer, lecturer
Samaire Armstrong (born 1980), American actor and fashion designer
Tammy Armstrong, Canadian poet and writer
The Armstrong Twins, bluegrass and country music act in the 1940s and '50s
Vaughn Armstrong, American actor

Politics and government
Cornelius W. Armstrong (1827–after 1872), New York politician
Ernest Armstrong (1915–1996), a British Labour Party politician.
Hilary Armstrong, British politician
 John Franklin Armstrong - Texas state representative
Kelly Armstrong, American politician from North Dakota
Ward Armstrong, American politician from Virginia

Religion
Annie Armstrong (1850–1938) American missionary leader
Garner Ted Armstrong (1930–2003), American evangelist, son of Herbert W. Armstrong
Herbert W. Armstrong (1892–1986), American evangelist, father of Garner Ted Armstrong

Science and technology
 Edwin Armstrong, full name Edwin Howard Armstrong, (1890–1954), American electrical engineer and inventor of FM radio
James Armstrong (engineer) (1947-2010), British structural engineer
Lilias Armstrong (1882–1937), English phonetician
Mark Armstrong (astronomer), British amateur astronomer
Neil Armstrong (1930–2012), American astronaut, first man on Moon
William Ward Armstrong, Canadian computer scientist

Sports
The Armstrong wrestling family (real last name James), an American family including:
Bob Armstrong (born Joseph Melton James, 1939–2020), and his sons:
Scott Armstrong (born Joseph Scott James, 1959)
Brad Armstrong (wrestler) (born Bradley James, 1961–2012)
Steve Armstrong (born Steve James, 1965)
Brian Armstrong, best known as Road Dogg (born Brian Girard James, 1969)
Alun Armstrong (footballer), English player
B. J. Armstrong, former basketball player, most notably with the Chicago Bulls
Brian Armstrong (footballer), New Zealand international football (soccer) player
Bruce Armstrong, American football player
Colby Armstrong, Canadian hockey player
Cornell Armstrong, American football player
Dale Armstrong (1941–2014), Canadian drag racer
Darrell Armstrong, American professional basketball player
Davey Armstrong, American boxer
Debbie Armstrong, Olympic gold medalist in Alpine skiing
Dorance Armstrong Jr., American football player
Duncan Armstrong, Australian Olympic gold medalist in swimming
Elizabeth Armstrong (water polo), an American water polo goalkeeper
Evan Armstrong, Scottish boxer of the 1960s and '70s
Gary Armstrong (rugby), Scottish rugby player
Gary Armstrong (footballer)
Genevieve Armstrong (born 1988), New Zealand rower
Gerry Armstrong, Northern Irish footballer
Graham Armstrong (1918–1960), American football player
Hilton Armstrong, American basketball player
Ken Armstrong (footballer born 1924), an England and New Zealand dual-international footballer
Ken Armstrong (footballer born 1959), an English-born footballer
Kevin Armstrong, Irish football player
Kristin Armstrong, professional road bicycle racer and Olympic gold medalist
Lance Armstrong, American cyclist
Marcus Armstrong, New Zealand racing driver
Mark Armstrong (equestrian), British international representative show-jumper
Mark Armstrong (footballer), New Zealand international football (soccer) player
Neil Armstrong (ice hockey)
Neill Armstrong, American football player
Norman Armstrong (1892–1990), English cricketer
Otis Armstrong, American football player
Ron Armstrong, a New Zealand international footballer
Russ Armstrong (Russel H. Armstrong; born 1962), American curler
Shawn Armstrong (born 1990), American baseball player
Stuart Armstrong, Scottish footballer
Tommy Armstrong Jr., American football player
Trace Armstrong, American football player
Warwick Armstrong, Australian Test cricketer

Other
Archibald Armstrong, (d. March 1672) court jester to James I and Charles I
Bigoe Armstrong (1717-1794), British Army general
Dwight Armstrong, American domestic terrorist
Elizabeth Armstrong (settler), an American settler who took part in the Black Hawk War
Eugene Armstrong, American construction contractor who was beheaded in Iraq
Frank A. Armstrong, United States Air Force General
Herbert Rowse Armstrong (1870–1922), British murderer - the "Hay poisoner",
J. Scott Armstrong, Wharton Business School professor
Rebekka Armstrong, bodybuilder, former Playboy model and AIDS activist
Ruth Alice Armstrong (1850–?), American activist
Sally Ward Lawrence Hunt Armstrong Downs, also known as Sallie Ward, (1827-1896), American socialite.
Harrison Armstrong, also known as Aitch, (Born 1999), British rapper.

Fictional people
The Armstrong family, victims of a crime in Murder on the Orient Express
The Armstrong family, protagonists of Lisa: The  Painful and its related games. Notably, Marty Armstrong, Bradley Armstrong, Lisa Armstrong, and Buddy Armstrong. 
Alex Louis Armstrong, the state alchemist from Fullmetal Alchemist
Olivier Mira Armstrong, the Briggs general from Fullmetal Alchemist
Catherine Elle Armstrong, the youngest daughter of Armstrong Family from Fullmetal Alchemist
Chuck Armstrong, a character from the Cars film series
Coach Armstrong, a character from Degrassi: The Next Generation.
Jack Armstrong, the All-American Boy, radio series character on the show of the same name (1933–1951)
Seth Armstrong - a character from Emmerdale
Steven Armstrong, the main antagonist from Metal Gear Rising: Revengeance
Stretch Armstrong, action figure first introduced in the 1970s
Sue Ellen Armstrong - a character from the fictional show Arthur
Tina Armstrong and her father, Bass, people from the Dead or Alive video game series

References

English-language surnames
Scottish surnames
Surnames of Lowland Scottish origin
Surnames of Ulster-Scottish origin

tr:Armstrong#Armstrong (soyadı)